The MTV 500 was a countdown of the Top 500 music videos of all time according to MTV. It was aired in the spring of 1997 and then again in November 1997, which saw 12 new videos from that year added in, while the other videos kept their same rankings.

History 
MTV ran 2 versions of this countdown, the first time in the spring of 1997 and then again in November 1997. The second viewing of the countdown kept the same rankings, but had new video replacements inserted. "Smells Like Teen Spirit" by Nirvana was named the number-one music video of all time.

See also 

MTV Video Music Award

References

MTV
Music videos
1997 in American television
Lists of music videos